A presidential election was held in the Socialist Republic of Romania on 29 March 1985.

Nicolae Ceaușescu was re-elected by the Great National Assembly as the President of Romania during its meeting of 28–29 March 1985; he was the only candidate.

Candidate

References

1985
1985 elections in Europe
Presidential election
Nicolae Ceaușescu
March 1985 events in Europe